The 1st Annual Maya Awards (Indonesian: Piala Maya 2012) was an award ceremony honoring the best in Indonesian films of 2012. The ceremony was held at The Bridge Function Room, Aston Hotel in Taman Rasuna, Kuningan, South Jakarta on 15 December 2012.

Lovely Man won the most awards with four.

Winners and nominees 
Winners are listed first and signified in bold letters.

Production

Performers

Competition

Special awards 
Gareth Evans for The Raid – For mainstreaming Indonesian martial arts, silat, to international audience.
Nani Widjaja for Ummi Aminah – For her constant dedication to Indonesian films.
Ira Maya Sopha for Mother Keder– For her four-decade career in Indonesian films.

Multiple wins and nominations 
The following films received multiple awards:

The following films receive multiple nominations:

References

External links
 Official website

Maya Awards (Indonesia)
2012 film awards